Nikolai V. Ivanov (born 1954) is a Russian mathematician who works on topology, geometry and group theory (particularly, modular Teichmüller groups). He is a professor at Michigan State University.

He obtained his Ph.D. under the guidance of Vladimir Abramovich Rokhlin in 1980 at the Steklov Mathematical Institute.

According to Google Scholar, on 5 July 2020, Ivanov's works had received 2,376 citations and his h-index was 22.

He is a fellow of the American Mathematical Society since 2012.

He is the author of the 1992 book Subgroups of Teichmüller Modular Groups.

Among his contributions to mathematics are his classification of subgroups of surface mapping class groups, and the establishment that surface mapping class groups satisfy the Tits alternative.

Selected publications 
"Automorphisms of complexes of curves and of Teichmuller spaces" (1997), International Mathematics Research Notices 14, pp. 651–666.
with John D. McCarthy: "On injective homomorphisms between Teichmüller modular groups I" (1999), Inventiones mathematicae 135 (2), pp. 425–486.
"On the homology stability for Teichmüller modular groups: closed surfaces and twisted coefficients" (1993), Contemporary Mathematics 150, pp. 149–149.

References

External links 
N. V. Ivanov website
Ivanov's blog

1954 births
Topologists
Geometers
Living people
Fellows of the American Mathematical Society
Michigan State University faculty
Steklov Institute of Mathematics alumni
20th-century Russian mathematicians
21st-century Russian mathematicians
Soviet mathematicians